Evermotion is a studio album by the American alternative rock band Guster. It was released on January 13, 2015, on both Ocho Mule, the band's own label, and Nettwerk Records. It was their first album in five years, following Easy Wonderful in 2010.

The album's title comes from a line in the song "Gangway" ("I'd lean into each turn seeking evermotion"). The first single from the album, "Simple Machine," was released on September 9, 2014, with the B-side track "Long Night." Guster stated on their website that they wanted to "become something else completely" with Evermotion.

Evermotion peaked at #32 on the Billboard 200 and reached #2 on the Alternative Albums chart.

Critical reception
Relix called the album "a relaxed and reassuring Sunday-morning record, a reservoir of tranquil tones for anyone in need of a relaxing respite."

Track listing

Charts

References 

2015 albums
Guster albums
Nettwerk Records albums
Albums produced by Richard Swift (singer-songwriter)